The University of Virginia School of Law (Virginia Law or UVA Law) is the law school of the University of Virginia, a public research university in Charlottesville, Virginia. It was founded in 1819 by Thomas Jefferson as part of his "academical village" which became University of Virginia where law was one of the original disciplines taught. UVA Law is the fourth-oldest active law school in the United States and the second-oldest continuously operating law school. The law school offers the J.D., LL.M., and S.J.D. degrees in law and hosts visiting scholars, visiting researchers and a number of legal research centers.

UVA Law is consistently ranked among the top 10 most prestigious law schools in the United States, and UVA Law is currently ranked 8th overall by U.S. News & World Report. UVA Law has been ranked in the "T14" law schools ever since U.S. News & World Report began publishing rankings.

UVA Law ranks 3rd in the number of alumni serving as general counsels and chief legal officers at the nation's top 500 companies.

Notable distinguished alumni include U.S. Supreme Court Justice James Clark McReynolds, as well as numerous members of U.S. Congress and judges on federal courts throughout the United States. UVA Law has more than 20,000 alumni in all 50 states, the District of Columbia, Guam, Puerto Rico, the U.S. Virgin Islands and 64 foreign countries.

Admissions

 For the class entering in the fall of 2021, 300 out of 7,080 J.D. applicants matriculated. The 25th and 75th LSAT percentiles for the 2021 entering class were 166 and 173, respectively, with a median of 171. The 25th and 75th undergraduate GPA percentiles were 3.64 and 3.97, respectively, with a median of 3.91. The Class of 2024 consists of students from 39 states and the District of Columbia and from 133 undergraduate institutions. The age range was 20 to 38, with the average age of 24. 51% of the class was female, 49% male, and 36% identified themselves as people of color. 72% of the class had postgraduate experience.
The LL.M. Program admits around 40-50 students each year. It provides an American legal education to lawyers who have obtained their first law degree in their home countries; LL.M. candidates take classes alongside J.D. students, allowing participants to fully engage in the community and plan their own coursework 
The S.J.D. Program has about 8 candidates, and it is intended primarily for aspiring legal academics.

Cost of attendance
The total cost of attendance (indicating the cost of tuition, fees, and living expenses) for first-year law students at UVA Law for the 2020–2021 academic year is $85,396 for Virginia residents and $88,396 for nonresidents. Law School Transparency has estimated that the debt-financed cost of attendance for three years, based on data from the 2019–2020 academic year, is $304,672 for residents; the estimated cost for non-residents is $314,961.

Campus
UVA Law receives no funding from the state; instead, the school depends upon the generosity of private donors (bolstered by its over 50% alumni giving rate), its substantial endowment (US $ 555 million), the 5th largest among all law schools, and student tuition payments. In 1995–1997, UVA Law used entirely donated funds to renovate and expand its buildings on the university's North Grounds to include the former facilities of the Darden Graduate School of Business Administration, which built a new campus several hundred yards away.

The Arthur J. Morris Law Library holds more than 820,000 volumes, including substantial collections of federal, state, and international documents, manuscripts, archives, and online research databases.

Student organizations
UVA Law maintains an extensive roster of student organizations, including chapters of the Federalist Society, the American Constitution Society and the St. Thomas More Society. The Virginia Law Weekly, UVA Law's student-run weekly newspaper, has been published since 1948. The paper has been cited in several court cases, including in the dissenting opinion of Justice Powell in the U.S. Supreme Court case Patterson v. New York. In addition to its news content, the VLW also contains student-submitted content, which often includes humorous and creative pieces.  The Law Weekly has won the American Bar Association's previous three "Best Newspaper Awards," in 2006, 2007, and 2008.

Each spring, over one hundred students write, direct and perform in The Libel Show, a comedy and musical theater production that was first organized in 1904.  Its performers roast Law School professors, student stereotypes and life in Charlottesville throughout each of its three nightly showings.  Professors write and sing their response to the students' jokes at the penultimate performance.

The school hosts an annual softball tournament to raise money for ReadyKids, an organization that provides care and counseling for at-risk families in Central Virginia, and the Public Interest Law Association, which provides public service internships for law students.  51 different law schools send teams to compete in men's and co-rec brackets.  In 2017, $25,000 was raised.

Law journals
UVA Law hosts 10 academic journals, including the Virginia Law Review, one of the most cited law journals in the country.

 Virginia Journal of International Law, the oldest student-edited international law journal in the country
 Virginia Environmental Law Journal
 Virginia Journal of Law & Technology
 Virginia Journal of Social Policy & the Law
 Virginia Law & Business Review
 Virginia Law Review
  Virginia Sports & Entertainment Law Journal
 Virginia Tax Review
 Virginia Journal of Criminal Law
 Journal of Law and Politics

Academics
UVA Law's curricular programs include the programs in Law & Business and Law and Public Service, as well as programs in international law, legal and constitutional history, criminal law, human rights, race and law, environmental and land use law, immigration law, intellectual property, public policy and regulation, health law, law and humanities, and animal law. UVA Law also has programs that help students build skills, such as the legal writing program, courses in professional ethics, trial advocacy and public speaking, and other practical-skills courses. The Princeton Review ranked UVA Law as first in "Best Quality of Life" and "Best Professors" among the nation's law schools, second in "Best Classroom Experience," fifth in "Toughest to Get Into," and sixth in "Career Prospects." The 2016 QS World University Rankings for law schools ranks UVA Law in the range of 51–100 worldwide and as the 13th-best law school in U.S.

Clinics
Among the more than 250 courses and seminars offered each year, UVA Law has 23 clinics:

 Appellate Litigation
 Civil Rights
 Community Solutions
 Criminal Defense
 Decarceration and Community Reentry
 Economic and Consumer Justice
 Employment Law
 Entrepreneurial Law
 Environmental Law and Community Engagement
 Federal Criminal Sentence Reduction
 First Amendment Law
 Health and Disability Law
 Holistic Juvenile Defense
 Immigration Law
 Innocence Project
 International Human Rights
 Litigation and Housing Law
 Nonprofit
 Patent and Licensing
 Project for Informed Reform
 Prosecution
 State and Local Government Policy
 Supreme Court Litigation
 Youth Advocacy

Study abroad
Students may participate in eight international exchange programs:

 Bocconi Law in Milan, Italy
 Bucerius Law School in Hamburg, Germany
 Hebrew University School of Law in Jerusalem, Israel
 Instituto de Empresa in Madrid, Spain
 Melbourne Law School in Melbourne, Australia
 Seoul National University in Seoul, South Korea
 Tel Aviv University Law School in Tel Aviv, Israel
 University of Auckland in Auckland, New Zealand
 University of Sydney in Sydney, Australia
 Waseda University in Tokyo, Japan

In addition, UVA Law offers rising third-year students the opportunity to obtain a dual degree from Sciences Po in Paris. Students who successfully complete this program earn a French law diploma (entitling them to sit for the French bar exam) and a J.D. degree from Virginia. Students also may spend one semester abroad through the student-initiated study abroad program or as an external studies project. Each year one-credit courses are offered in Paris and Tel Aviv through the January Term.

Institutes and centers
UVA Law includes several internationally known special programs and centers directed by faculty members.

 The John W. Glynn, Jr. Law & Business Program
 Program in Law and Public Service
 Center for International & Comparative Law
 Program on Constitutional Law and Legal History
 Center for Criminal Justice
 Karsh Center for Law and Democracy
 Virginia Center for Tax Law
 PLACE: Program in Law, Communities and the Environment
 National Security Law Center
 LawTech Center
 Center for the Study of Race and Law
 Health Law
 Human Rights Program
 Center for Public Law and Political Economy
 First Amendment Center
 Family Law Center
 Center for Law & Philosophy
 Intellectual Property
 Immigration Law
 Public Policy and Regulation
 Institute of Law, Psychiatry and Public Policy
 John M. Olin Program in Law and Economics 
 Animal Law Program

Rankings
UVA Law has long been regarded as one of the most prestigious law schools in the United States. As of 2020, 
UVA Law ranked No. 1 in Best Classroom Experience, Best Professors and Best Quality of Life according to The Princeton Review. U.S. News & World Report ranks UVA Law as eighth in the nation. In the 2019 Above the Law rankings, which focuses on employment outcomes, UVA Law ranked first in the nation. A study published in the Journal of Legal Education ranked UVA Law fourth in the number of partners in the National Law Journal's top 100 firms.

Post-graduate employment
According to UVA Law's official 2019 ABA-required disclosures, 92.6% of the Class of 2018 obtained non-school funded full-time, long-term, JD-required employment ten months after graduation. A 2019 analysis conducted by Law.com placed Virginia in second for employment outcomes, behind Columbia, with 92.64% of graduates obtaining employment within ten months.

Law firms
UVA Law is fourth in the number of partners in the National Law Journal's top 100 firms, and a survey by the NLJ found that UVA Law ranked third in the number of associates promoted to partner among the NLJ's top 250 firms in 2015.  Additionally, UVA Law is second only to Harvard in the number of alumni serving as chief legal counsel at Fortune 500 companies. Alumni from UVA Law are also employed at 100 of the American Lawyer top 100 law firms (as of May 2016). In a 2010 study by Stanford Graduate School of Business professors, Virginia ranked fifth in the number of lawyers at the top 300 U.S. law firms.

Clerkships
From 2005 to 2018, UVA Law had the fourth-highest placement of law clerks on the United States Supreme Court, surpassed only by Yale, Harvard and Stanford. In 2016 UVA Law alumni set a school record for obtaining the most appellate court clerkships in a term.

Deans of the University of Virginia School of Law 
 1904–1932 William Minor Lile
 1932–1937 Armistead Dobie
 1939–1963 F.D.G. Ribble
 1963–1968 Hardy C. Dillard
 1968–1976 Monrad G. Paulsen
 1976–1980 Emerson Spies
 1980–1988 Richard A. Merrill
 1988–1991 Thomas H. Jackson
 1991–2001 Robert E. Scott
 2001–2008 John C. Jeffries Jr.
 2008–2016 Paul G. Mahoney
 2016–present Risa L. Goluboff

Notable faculty and alumni

Alumni 

UVA Law maintains a list of prominent alumni and has graduated many influential figures in government, business, the judiciary, academia, journalism, and the law, including Woodrow Wilson, Robert F. Kennedy, Ted Kennedy, Lowell Weicker, John Warner,  David K.E. Bruce, Louis Auchincloss, DeMaurice Smith, Robert Mueller, Janet Napolitano and others. The school's alumni giving rate of more than 50 percent for the past 11 years is among the highest of the nation's law schools.

Faculty 
Many of UVA Law's faculty are prominent scholars and academics, including Anne Coughlin, professor of criminal law, John F. Duffy, who teaches intellectual property, and law school dean Risa L. Goluboff, who is also a professor of legal history and constitutional law.

Current faculty:
 Kenneth Abraham – insurance law, torts
 Richard Bonnie (LL.B. 1969) – criminal law, bioethics, public policy
 Naomi R. Cahn – family law, trusts and estates, feminist jurisprudence
 Jonathan Cannon - Blaine T Phillips Distinguished Professor of Environmental Law Emeritus
 Danielle Citron – privacy, free expression, civil rights
 Anne Coughlin – criminal law, feminist jurisprudence
 Ashley Deeks – national security, international law, intelligence and the laws of war
 John Duffy – patent law, international intellectual property, administrative law
 Risa Goluboff – Dean, legal history, constitutional law, constitutional history, civil rights
 John C. Harrison – constitutional law, administrative law, constitutional history
 A.E. Dick Howard (LL.B. 1961) – constitutional law, comparative constitutionalism, constitutional history
 John Jeffries (J.D. 1973) – Dean Emeritus, criminal law, constitutional law, civil rights
 Douglas Laycock – constitutional law, religious liberties, remedies
 M. Elizabeth Magill (J.D. 1995) – Provost of the University of Virginia, administrative law, constitutional law
 Paul G. Mahoney – Dean Emeritus, securities regulation, corporations
 John Monahan – social science in law, mental health law
 Caleb Nelson – civil procedure, federal courts
 Cynthia Nicoletti – legal history, constitutional history, property
 James E. Ryan (J.D. 1992) – President of the University of Virginia, education law, constitutional law
 Frederick Schauer – constitutional law and theory, philosophy of law, freedom of expression
 Micah Schwartzman (J.D. 2005) – Law and religion, legal theory, constitutional law and theory
 John Setear – international law, international environmental law, foreign relations
 Lawrence Solum – philosophy of law, constitutional theory, procedure
 Steven Walt – commercial law, contracts, bankruptcy
 G. Edward White – legal history, constitutional law, torts

Former faculty:
 Lillian BeVier (1973-2010) - Distinguished Professor of Law Emeritus
 Antonin G. Scalia (1967-1974) – Associate U.S. Supreme Court Justice

References

External links
University of Virginia School of Law

 
Law, School of
Virginia
Education in Charlottesville, Virginia
1819 establishments in Virginia
Educational institutions established in 1819